Harakat-e-Mulavi is a militia group that resisted the Soviet Union during the Soviet occupation of Afghanistan.

Named in the Seton Hall studies
A team of legal scholars, led by Mark Denbeaux, a Professor at Seton Hall University's School of Law, published a series of reports in 2006, based on the documents released by the US Department of Defense.  The second report on the Guantanamo detainees, entitled: "Inter- and Intra-Departmental Disagreements About Who Is Our Enemy" documented that the Department of Defense was detaining captives for association with organizations that the Department of Homeland Security did not regard as a threat.
While the Department of Homeland Security does not regard membership in Harakat-e-Mulavi, or an association with Harakat-e-Mulavi. as a reason to prevent a traveler from entering the USA, 
JTF-GTMO analysts regard an alleged association with Harakat-e-Mulavi justifies indefinite extrajudicial detention.

Abdullah Mujahid and Harakat-e-Mulavi
Guantanamo captive Abdullah Mujahid acknowledges that he fought, with Harakat-e-Mulavie, against Afghanistan's Soviet occupiers, during the 1980s.
During his Combatant Status Review Tribunal and Administrative Review Board hearings Mujahid faced the allegation that he was still associated with Harakat-e-Mulavi, and that it was fighting Afghanistan's American occupiers in 2003.

Abdullah Mujahid was captured in July 2003 and remained in extrajudicial detention in Guantanamo four years later.

References

Military history of Afghanistan
Paramilitary organisations based in Afghanistan